Ricardo Mañé Ramirez (Montevideo, 14 January 1948 – Montevideo, 9 March 1995) was a Uruguayan mathematician, known for his contributions to dynamical systems and ergodic theory. He was a doctoral student of Jacob Palis at IMPA.

He was an invited speaker at the International Congresses of Mathematicians of 1983 and 1994 and is a recipient of the 1994 TWAS Prize.

Selected publications
 "Expansive diffeomorphisms", Proceedings of the Symposium on Dynamical Systems (University of Warwick, 1974) Lecture Notes in Mathematics Vol. 468 pp. 162–174, Springer-Verlag, 1975.
 "Persistent manifolds are normally hyperbolic", Transactions of the American Mathematical Society, Vol. 246, (Dec., 1978), pp. 261–283.
 "On the dimension of the compact invariant sets of certain non-linear maps", Springer, Lectures Notes in Mathematics Vol. 898 (1981) 230–242.
 "An ergodic closing lemma", Annals of Mathematics Second Series, Vol. 116, No. 3 (Nov., 1982), pp. 503–540.
 with P. Sad. and D. Sullivan: "On the dynamics of rational maps", Annales Scientifiques l'École Normale Supérieure, Vol. 16, Issue 2, pp. 193–217, 1983.
 "A proof of the C1 stability conjecture", Publications Mathématiques de l'IHÉS, Vol. 66, pp. 161–210, 1987
 "On the topological entropy of geodesic flows". Journal of Differential Geometry, Vol. 45 (1997), no. 1, pp. 74–93.
 Ergodic Theory and Differentiable Dynamics (1987, translated from Portuguese into English by Silvio Levy)
 Selected Works, Springer, 2017

References

1948 births
1995 deaths
20th-century Uruguayan mathematicians
Members of the Brazilian Academy of Sciences
Dynamical systems theorists
Instituto Nacional de Matemática Pura e Aplicada alumni
Instituto Nacional de Matemática Pura e Aplicada researchers
TWAS laureates